Giuffrida Répaci (born March 19, 1964 in Turin, Italy) is an Italian journalist, director of the magazine La Lettre b.

Education and career 
Giuffrida Répacii completed a degree in Law in 1990 at the University of Genoa. He also studied at the City of London Polytechnic and the King's College London.

He started his career as journalist in 1982, as speaker at the radio station Radio Riviera Tre. In 1989 he moved to Radio One and became a reporter for the News Agency Hi News. In 1994 Giuffrida Répaci moved to Brussels to become correspondent of the Agency L’Altra News.

In 2003 he founded the News Agency DSPRESS  and became Editor in chief of the magazine L’Incontro”.
In 2010 he was called as director for the news magazine La Lettre b.

Since February 2019 he serves as Brussels' correspondent for the italian News Agency 9 Colonne.

Founding member of the NGO ITACA  and Coordinator of the project ANTENOR, since September 2020 he is the Director of RadioCOM, the first web-radio in italian for the italian communities abroad.

In 2013 he won the Michel Vanderborght Award for journalism with the following motivation: "Filippo Giuffrida joins in his person both sides of our tasks – the principal anti-fascism and the good journalism. First he lives for long time in Brussels and reports about the problems and developments of the EU. In his view are the real problems of the people, the social segregation and the democratic development. Especially the actual economic crisis and the social consequences he brings on the floor. Second he is an activist of the Italian antifascist organization ANPI as an international representative at the European Parliament and for all Italian in Belgium."

In 2020 he won the Radnoty Award  for journalism.

Filippo Giuffrida is the great-nephew of the Italian writer and journalist Leonida Rèpaci.
President of the Belgian branch of ANPI he was elected Vice President of the International Federation of Resistance Fighters – Association of Anti-Fascists.

 Publications 
He is one of the authors of the book  Lettere dall’Europa  and frequently writes for the Italian Magazine Patria Indipendente''

References

1964 births
Living people
Journalists from Turin
Italian male journalists